General elections were held in Italy on 22 October 1865, with a second round of voting on 29 October. It was the second one in the history of Italy.

Electoral campaign
The Historical Right was led by the former Prime Minister of the Kingdom of Sardinia, Alfonso Ferrero La Marmora, a long-time general who fought during the Italian unification.

On the other hand, the bloc of the Historical Left was led by Urbano Rattazzi, a liberal politician who was between the founders of the Italian left-wing parliamentary group.

In opposition to the two main blocs there were a third party known as The Extreme, a far-left coalition, under the leadership of Giuseppe Mazzini, an Italian revolutionary and a key figure of the Unification.

On 22 and 29 October, only 504,263 men of a total population of around 23 million were entitled to vote. Right-wing candidates emerged as the largest bloc in Parliament with around 41% of the 443 seats. They were largely aristocrats representing rentiers from the north of the country, and held moderate political views including loyalty to the crown and low government spending; the general La Marmora was appointed Prime Minister by the king Victor Emmanuel II.

Parties and leaders

Results

References

General elections in Italy
Italy
General
Italy